Raghunathpur  is a village in Chanditala I community development block of Srirampore subdivision in Hooghly district in the Indian state of West Bengal.

Geography

Gram panchayat
Villages in Shiakhala gram panchayat are: Chak Tajpur, Madhupur, Paschim Tajpur, Patul, Raghunathpur, Sandhipur and Sehakhala.

Demographics
As per 2011 Census of India Raghunathpur had a total population of 645 of which 322 (50%) were males and 323 (50%) were females. Population below 6 years was 87. The total number of literates in Raghunathpur was 409 (73.30% of the population over 6 years).

References 

Villages in Chanditala I CD Block